Sheer Heart Attack is the third studio album by the British rock band Queen, released on 8 November 1974 by EMI Records in the United Kingdom and by Elektra Records in the United States. Digressing from the progressive themes featured on their first two albums, the album featured more pop-centric and conventional rock tracks and marked a step towards the "classic" Queen sound. It was produced by the band and Roy Thomas Baker, and launched Queen to mainstream popularity in the UK and throughout the world.

The album's first single "Killer Queen" reached number 2 in the British charts and provided the band with their first top 20 hit in the US, peaking at number 12 on the Billboard singles chart. Sheer Heart Attack was the first Queen album to hit the US top 20, peaking at number 12 in 1975. It has been acknowledged for containing "a wealth of outstanding hard rock guitar tracks". Retrospectively, it has been listed by multiple publications as one of the band's best works and has been deemed an essential glam rock album.

Background and recording

After completing their second album, Queen embarked on their Queen II Tour as a support act for Mott the Hoople. After touring extensively throughout the UK, the two groups decided to tour together in the US, marking Queen's first tour in the country. The bands would remain on friendly terms for the rest of their career, with Ian Hunter performing "All the Young Dudes" at the Freddie Mercury Tribute Concert. Queen played their first US show on 4 April 1974 in Denver, Colorado, as a support, which Freddie Mercury reportedly disliked, saying: "Being support is one of the most traumatic experiences of my life". At the climax of the tour in Boston, Brian May was discovered to have hepatitis, possibly from the use of a contaminated needle during vaccinations the group received before travelling to Australia. The remainder of the tour was subsequently cancelled and Queen flew back home, where May was hospitalised.

In June, the band gathered together at Trident Studios to start rehearsing material for the album. Koh Hasebe interviewed Mercury, Taylor, and Deacon when they were rehearsing on 13 June. At the beginning of July, May joined them for rehearsals. The band were just preparing to record, and on 7 July, they trekked three and a half hours to get to the Rockfield Studios in Wales, where they would record ten backing tracks, finishing on 28 July. At the start of August, work shifted to Wessex Sound Studios. Work there would not last long, however, as May, who was starting to feel uneasy, went to a specialist clinic on 2 August. He collapsed at the clinic, as a result of a duodenal ulcer, and would be operated on the following day, but discharged from the hospital soon after so he could recover at home. While the band were overdubbing at Wessex, May booked studio time at AIR Studios, where he recorded "Dear Friends", and "She Makes Me". In the meantime, Taylor and Deacon made an appearance at an EMI/Radio Luxembourg motor rally at Brands Hatch on 11 August. By late August, May was working with the band again, and the rest of the band would add their parts to the songs he had recorded. There was still one song that needed to be recorded as the band worked into September, and that was "Now I'm Here". They recorded the backing track for this one at Wessex, and saved the rest to be completed during the mixing sessions.

Mixing commenced in the middle of September. The band were still overdubbing at this point, so they hired someone to deliver tapes from recording studio to mixing studio via motorcycle. The heart of the mixing sessions took place at Trident Studios, and one or two days was spent mixing each of the majority of the songs. "Brighton Rock", on the other hand, took four days to mix, with six hours' worth of different mixes created during that time. Each song was mixed in little edited sections that were about fifteen to twenty seconds in length. At this point, Trident had just installed a 24-track machine in their studio that had been around since 1972, but was not functioning until 1974. In fact, the album was Trident's first 24-track project. Even though Trident had expanded their recording flexibility by eight tracks, it still wasn't enough to mix each track individually. "Bring Back That Leroy Brown", for example, had 70 vocal tracks and had to be mixed down to work with the 24-track mixer.

On 20 September, it was announced the band were attempting to secure a release date for the album of 1 November, though it seemed unlikely they would be done in time to meet that deadline. They mixed "Now I'm Here", which was the last thing to be mixed, on 22 October. May did an interview the next day (which was published on 26 October) that explained what finishing the album was like. In total, the band used four different studios in the making of Sheer Heart Attack: most of the backing tracks were recorded at Rockfield, two backing tracks and some guitar overdubs were recorded at AIR Studios, most of the overdubs and one backing track were recorded at Wessex, and the mixing was done at Trident.

Songs

Overview
The album noticeably shifts away from the progressive rock themes of its predecessors, and has been categorised as hard rock and glam rock. The Daily Vault described it as "an important transition album" because it showcased "what the band would soon become while giving a nod to their hard-rock past," while Stephen Thomas Erlewine of Allmusic observed that, although there are still references to the fantasy themes of their earlier works, particularly on "In the Lap of the Gods" and "Lily of the Valley", "the fantasy does not overwhelm as it did on the first two records".

"Killer Queen" was written in a single night, which contrasts with the, as Mercury put it, "ages" it took to write "The March of the Black Queen". "Brighton Rock" was written during the making of Queen II, "Stone Cold Crazy" had its genesis in Mercury's pre-Queen band Wreckage, and Mercury wrote "Flick of the Wrist" during May's illness-induced absence. As it included the first song written by John Deacon that Queen recorded ("Misfire") alongside tracks written by the other members of the band, Sheer Heart Attack was the first of the group's albums to contain at least one song written by each member; "Stone Cold Crazy" was the band's first song for which all four members shared the writing credit.

Side one

"Brighton Rock"

"Brighton Rock" was written by Brian May during the Queen II sessions, but was not recorded at that time, as the group felt it would not fit with the rest of the album. Lyrically, it tells the story of two young lovers named Jenny and Jimmy, who meet in Brighton on a public holiday. Mods travelling to Brighton on bank holidays was a popular narrative at the time, as in The Who's Quadrophenia. Jenny cannot linger because she is afraid her mother will find out "how I spent my holiday", but afterwards "writes a letter every day"; Jimmy, who was eager on the day, responds that he is afraid of discovery by "my lady".

The song includes a three-minute unaccompanied guitar solo interlude, which makes extensive use of delay to build up guitar harmony and contrapuntal melodic lines. It grew out of May's experimentation with an Echoplex unit while he attempted to recreate his guitar orchestrations for live performances of "Son and Daughter". He had made modifications to the original unit so he could change the delay times, and ran each echo through a separate amplifier to avoid interference.

The studio version of the solo only contains one "main" guitar and one "echoed" guitar for a short section, but, live, May would usually split his guitar signal into one "main" and two "echoed" guitars, with each going to a separate bank of amplifiers. In concert, the solo has been performed as part of "Brighton Rock", in a medley with another song, or as a standalone piece. For example, May performed some of it at the closing ceremony of the 2012 Summer Olympics in London. Considered one of May's finest solos, Guitar World ranked it No. 41 on their list of the 100 Greatest Guitar Solos of All Time.

There was renewed interest in the song after it was used during the climactic final action scene of the 2017 film Baby Driver.

"Killer Queen"

"Killer Queen" was the band's first international hit single. It is one of the few songs written by Freddie Mercury for which he wrote the lyrics, which are about a high class prostitute, before the music. The band initially recorded tracks for the song without May, because he was recovering in hospital from a duodenal ulcer, leaving spaces for him to fill when he was better. Mercury played a jangle piano as well as a grand piano on the recording. After it charted as a single, the band performed the song on Top of the Pops.

"Tenement Funster"/"Flick of the Wrist"/"Lily of the Valley" medley

Roger Taylor wrote "Tenement Funster" about youth and rebellion and sang lead vocals, while John Deacon played the song's prominent acoustic guitar parts in May's absence. It segues into Mercury's "Flick of the Wrist" (which was released, along with "Killer Queen", as a double A-sided single), and then into a softer, piano-based Mercury song, "Lily of the Valley", making the three songs a medley.

"Now I'm Here"

"Now I'm Here" was written by May while hospitalised, and recalls the group's early tour supporting Mott the Hoople. It was recorded during the last week of the sessions for the album, with May playing piano.

Side two

"In the Lap of the Gods"
"In the Lap of the Gods" was written by Mercury and featured multiple vocal overdubs from himself and Roger Taylor. It features one of the highest notes on the album, sung by Taylor. Other than the name, it is completely unrelated to In the Lap of the Gods...Revisited.

"Stone Cold Crazy"

"Stone Cold Crazy" was one of the earliest tracks that Queen performed live, and had several different arrangements before being recorded for Sheer Heart Attack. No band member was able to remember who had written the lyrics when the album was released, so they shared the writing credit, the first of their songs to do so. The lyrics deal with gangsters and include a reference to Al Capone. The track has a fast tempo and heavy distortion, presaging speed metal. Music magazine Q described "Stone Cold Crazy" as "thrash metal before the term was invented". The song was played live at almost every Queen concert between 1974 and 1978.

Metallica covered the song as their contribution to the 1990 compilation album Rubáiyát: Elektra's 40th Anniversary. This cover version was later used as a B-side of their "Enter Sandman" single and subsequently won a Grammy Award; it also appeared on their covers/B-sides album Garage Inc. The Metallica version of the song is more aggressive than the original, and they slightly altered the lyrics, adding two uses of the word "fuck" and changing the more humorous lines for more violent lyrics, such as: "walking down the street/shooting people that I meet/with my fully loaded tommy gun". James Hetfield of Metallica performed it, together with Queen & Tony Iommi of Black Sabbath-fame and using the altered lyrics, at The Freddie Mercury Tribute Concert in 1992. Metallica played the song as an encore during their 1991–93 Black Album tour. It appears on their 1993 live CD Live Shit: Binge & Purge and their 2009 live DVD Français Pour une Nuit.

"Dear Friends"
"Dear Friends" is a ballad written by May and sung by Mercury.

"Misfire"
"Misfire" was John Deacon's first individual composition for the band, and featured him playing most of the guitar parts on the track.

"Bring Back That Leroy Brown"
The title of "Bring Back That Leroy Brown" alludes to the then-recent hit "Bad Bad Leroy Brown" by American singer-songwriter Jim Croce, who had died in a plane crash the previous year. Written by Mercury, "Bring Back That Leroy Brown" features him playing grand piano and jangle piano, as well as doing multiple vocal overdubs. May plays a short section on ukulele-banjo, and Deacon plays a line on the double bass. DRUM! Magazine has commended Taylor's drum work on the song, calling it a good example of his versatility: "It really shows off Taylor’s versatility. He nails dozens of kicks throughout this fast and tricky song and proves that he could’ve been a big band drummer or ably fit into any theatrical pit band if Queen hadn’t worked out so well for him. Honky-tonk piano, upright bass, ukulele-banjo, and a smokin' drummer all add up to a rollicking good time."

Live, the song was played in a shortened arrangement that was, except for the very end and one other line, purely instrumental. May's ukulele-banjo was brought onstage especially for this song.

An a cappella version of the track was included on the bonus EP of the 2011 reissue of Sheer Heart Attack.

"She Makes Me (Stormtrooper in Stilettoes)"
"She Makes Me (Stormtrooper in Stilettoes)" was written and sung by May with him and Deacon playing acoustic guitars. Its finale features what May referred to as "New York nightmare sounds", which include NYC police vehicle sirens and deep-breathing sounds.

"In the Lap of the Gods...Revisited"
"In the Lap of the Gods...Revisited" was Mercury's first attempt to write a song that the audience would sing along to, similar to the later, and more successful, "We Are the Champions". It was one of Queen's set-closers from 1974 to 1977. During the 1986 Magic tour, it was performed again in a medley, where it segued into "Seven Seas of Rhye".

Reception and legacy

At the time of its release, NME called the album: "A feast. No duffers, and four songs that will just run and run: 'Killer Queen', 'Flick of the Wrist', 'Now I'm Here', and 'In the Lap of the Gods...Revisited'." The Winnipeg Free Press commended "Brian May's multi-tracked guitar, Freddie Mercury's stunning vocalising and Roy Thomas Baker's dynamic production work", calling the album "a no-holds barred, full-scale attack on the senses". Circus referred to the album as "perhaps the heaviest, rockingest assault on these shores we've enjoyed in some time". Rolling Stone wrote: "If it's hard to love, it's hard not to admire: this band is skilled, after all, and it dares." John Mendelsohn, however, was unimpressed, writing: "I hunted all over both sides of this latest album for something, anything, even remotely as magnificent as 'Keep Yourself Alive' or 'Father to Son', only to end up empty-eared and bawling." As 1974 drew to a close, the album was ranked by Disc as the third best of the year and tied for 24th place on NME's end-of-year list.

In a retrospective review, AllMusic said that "the theatricality is now wielded on everyday affairs, which ironically makes them sound larger than life. And this sense of scale, combined with the heavy guitars, pop hooks, and theatrical style, marks the true unveiling of Queen, making Sheer Heart Attack as  the moment where they truly came into their own." Q called the record "indispensable" and "one of the great pop/rock admixtures of the '70s". Pitchfork wrote: "Sheer Heart Attack not only improves on every aspect of their sound suggested by the first two records, but delivers some of the finest music of their career ... this is the band at the height of its powers." Jon Bryan of Backseat Mafia described it as "the first album where Queen got it unarguably right", noting that "such obvious arrogance suited them".

Benjamin Ray of the Daily Vault felt that "Queen somehow manages to sound like every rock band of the 70s on here, including Rush, Zeppelin and even Uriah Heep." However, he noted the difference was that "Queen actually tries to be pretentious and bombastic, and often they are so over the top one can't help but be entertained", finally concluding that it was "their most fun and showcases everything they did right." The BBC wrote: "they stretched contemporary production methods to their very limit with multi-layered vocals and guitars and Freddie's vaudevillian streak finally emerged ... this was the album that finally saw Queen find their true voice." Rock historian Paul Fowles wrote that Sheer Heart Attack "saw the band become increasingly focused on the emerging cult figure of Mercury" and his "unique brand of rock theater", especially on the single "Killer Queen".

Accolades

Mercury's appraisal

2011 reissue
On 8 November 2010, record company Universal Music announced that a remastered and expanded reissue of the album would be released in May 2011, as part of a new deal between Queen and Universal Music, which meant the band's association with EMI Records would come to an end after almost 40 years. Queen's entire studio catalogue was reissued in 2011.

Track listing

Original release
All lead vocals by Freddie Mercury unless noted.

Universal Music reissue (2011)

iTunes deluxe edition

Personnel
Track numbers refer to CD and digital releases.
Queen
Freddie Mercury – lead vocals , backing vocals , piano , Hammond organ , jangle piano 
Brian May – electric guitar , backing vocals , piano , lead vocals , acoustic guitar , banjolele 
Roger Taylor – drums , backing vocals , percussion , triangle , wind chimes , lead vocals , tambourine , timpani 
John Deacon – bass guitar , acoustic guitar , electric guitar , double bass

Charts

Weekly charts

Year-end charts

Certifications

References

External links
Queen official website: Discography: Sheer Heart Attack: includes lyrics of all non-bonus tracks
Lyrics of "In Lap of the Gods…Revisited" from Live at Wembley '86 on Queen's official website

1974 albums
Albums produced by Roy Thomas Baker
Albums recorded at Trident Studios
Albums with cover art by Mick Rock
Elektra Records albums
EMI Records albums
Hollywood Records albums
Parlophone albums
Queen (band) albums
Albums recorded at Rockfield Studios
Albums recorded at AIR Studios